Space 1.8 is the debut album by Belgian-Caribbean musician Nala Sinephro. It was released on 3 September 2021, through Warp Records.

Composition
Space 1.8 is seen as a fusion of ambient music and spiritual jazz. It is also seen as an "understated" and minimalist electroacoustic work.

Track listing

Personnel
 Nala Sinephro – pedal harp, modular synths
 Lyle Barton - piano, keyboard
 Shirley Tetteh - guitar
 James Mollison - saxophone
 Nubya Garcia - saxophone
 Ahnansé - saxophone
 Jake Long - drums
 Edward Wakili-Hick - drums
 Twm Dylan - double bass
 Rudi Creswick - double bass
 Dwayne Kilvington - synth bass

Charts

References

2021 albums
Warp (record label) albums